Lõõtsavägilased (English: Accordion Heroes) is an Estonian folk music ensemble founded in 2014.

The beginning of Lõõtsavägilased can be considered December 2013, when Margus Põldsepp put together an ensemble of his students,  Andres Eelmaa, Rasmus Kadaja, Tobias Tae, who went to study melodeon with him as an additional instrument. In the beginning, only instrumental stories were learned, but then more and more emphasis was placed on singing. In the first years, only four accordions could be seen on stage, but in 2017, soloist Andres Eelmaa exchanged his main instrument for a bass guitar to add more sound to the ensemble. In January 2019, Ott-Mait Põldsepp joined the ensemble, playing guitar and mandolin.

The accordionists mainly play folk and traditional music. They have performed at all major folk festivals across Estonia and collaborated with Untsakad, Zetode, Jaan Pehk, Hardi Volmer and Metsatöll.

History 
In the first years, only four accordions could be seen on stage, but in 2017, soloist Andres Eelmaa exchanged his main instrument for a bass guitar to add more sound to the ensemble. In January 2019, Ott-Mait Põldsepp joined the ensemble, playing guitar and mandolin.

In five years, the ensemble has given more than 600 concert performances.

Discography

Albums 

 "Meie noor ja tormiline veri" (2015)
 "Edimise numre miis" (2016)
 "#Kolmaz" (2018)
 "Pidu kodun" (2019)
 "Lõõtsavägilased" (2022)

Singles 

 "Edimise numre miis" (2016)
 "Vanapoisi reilender" (2017)
 "Kui laubä õhta jõudis" (2018)
 "Ära sinä võtku pikka naist" (2019)
 "Sabalugu" (2020)
 "Kippar Kliiverpoom" (2022)

Members 
 Andres Eelmaa - bass guitar, vocals
 Ott-Mait Põldsepp - acoustic guitar, mandolin, vocals
 Rasmus Kadaja - , garmon, vocals
 Margus Põldsepp -, garmon, vocals
 Tobias Tae - , garmon, vocals
 Georg-Rasmus Mäe - sound engineer

External links 
 Official Website
 Youtube Channel
 WIX Website

References 

Estonian musical groups
Estonian folk rock groups
Estonian folk music groups
Musical groups established in 2013